Kenneth Boyle (November 27, 1937 – March 11, 2000) was an American lawyer and politician.

Boyle was born in Springfield, Illinois and graduated from Virden Community High School in Virden, Illinois. He served in the United States Army. He received his bachelor's and law degrees from University of Illinois. Boyle lived in Chatham, Illinois and worked as a special Illinois Assistant Attorney. Boyle served in the Illinois House of Representatives from 1971 to 1977 and was a Democrat. He was elected State's Attorney for Macoupin County, Illinois in 1976. In 1980, Boyle served as the first director of the Illinois State's Attorneys Appellate Prosecutor's Office until his retirement. Boyle died from cancer at the Rush-Presbyterian-St. Luke's Medical Center in Chicago, Illinois.

Notes

External links

1937 births
2000 deaths
Politicians from Springfield, Illinois
Military personnel from Illinois
University of Illinois College of Law alumni
Illinois lawyers
Democratic Party members of the Illinois House of Representatives
Deaths from cancer in Illinois
20th-century American politicians
United States Army soldiers
20th-century American lawyers